Sowerby Bridge railway station serves the town of Sowerby Bridge in West Yorkshire, England.

History 

The original station was opened on 5 October 1840 by the Manchester and Leeds Railway, on a site  further west (on the other side of the River Ryburn) of the current site. Ahead of the opening of the Rishworth Branch in the 1880s, a new station was built on the current site - this opened on 1 September 1876.

Through trains between Manchester & York over the route had ended in the mid-1960s (due to the Beeching Axe), leaving a much-reduced DMU service in later years that started/terminated here and connected with the Calder Valley trains via Bradford. The route remained in use for freight and was subsequently re-opened to passengers on a limited basis in 2000, with an all day service restored in 2007.

A major fire in 1978 resulted in the demolition of most of the buildings by British Rail in 1980. New canopies were erected in 1981 on the remaining platforms, with a ticket office housed in the surviving wing of the 1870s station, however this closed in 1983 and the station is now unstaffed. In 2008, the former ticket office building was re-opened as a bar called the Jubilee Refreshment Rooms.

A ticket machine was installed in 2011, allowing passengers to buy tickets before boarding for the first time in almost 30 years. Recent work has seen the installation of an electronic Passenger information system (PIS), giving details of forthcoming departures, and the car park enlarged which is currently free to use.  Step-free access is available to both platforms via the inclined subway linking them or from adjoining roads.

A volunteer group, The Friends of Sowerby Bridge Railway Station, was founded in 2010, to improve the station's environs. Since the COVID-19 pandemic the Jubilee Refreshment rooms has been closed and, as of August 2022, there has not been mention of a re-opening date.

Accidents and incidents
On 22 October 1903, an express passenger train was in collision with a light engine due to a signalman's error. Another passenger train collided with the wreckage at low speed. One person was killed.
The 70 passengers de-trained and walked back through the railway to the station. Although the last coach was on fire and the passengers evacuated past the blazing coach, there were no casualties.

Services 

The station now has a twice hourly basic service on weekdays and Saturdays. Eastbound trains run to Leeds via Bradford and via Dewsbury (hourly to each, plus a few peak extras). Weekday service to Chester service via  began at the May 2019 timetable change. The York to  service that previously stopped here all week now only does so on Monday-Saturday evening peak services and Sundays, which has led to complaints from the local rail user group with regard to the reduction in service levels.

Sundays see an hourly service each way between York and Blackpool North trains (as noted above) and an hourly service between Leeds and Manchester Victoria. All these service go via Halifax and Bradford Interchange, there are no services from Sowerby Bridge via Dewsbury on a Sunday.

Route 

At Milner Royd Junction, approximately a quarter of a mile to the east of the lines to Halifax and Brighouse diverge. Immediately east of the station, the dismantled branch line to Ripponden and Rishworth diverged to the southwest, until its closure in 1958.  This had at one time its own separate wooden platform south of the main station and linked to it by a short footpath.

Gallery

References

External links 

Milner Royd Junction

Railway stations in Calderdale
DfT Category F1 stations
Former Lancashire and Yorkshire Railway stations
Railway stations in Great Britain opened in 1840
Railway stations in Great Britain closed in 1876
Railway stations in Great Britain opened in 1876
Northern franchise railway stations
Sowerby Bridge